James David Gailliard (born January 9, 1965) is an American pastor and politician. He is senior pastor and CEO of Word Tabernacle Church in Rocky Mount, North Carolina, and a Democratic member of the North Carolina House of Representatives. Gailliard has represented the 25th district (including most of Nash County) since 2019. He attended Morehouse College and St. Joseph's University.

Gailliard won the November 2018 general election for House District 25 (Nash County/Rocky Mount); the first African-American to hold this seat. He secured fifty-one percent of the vote while his closest rival, Republican John Check, secured forty-five percent.

Electoral history

2022

2020

2018

2016

Committee assignments

2021-2022 session
Appropriations
Appropriations - Capital
Education - Community Colleges
Education - K-12 
Health

2019-2020 session
Appropriations
Appropriations - Education 
Education - K-12 
Health

References

External links
Government web site
World Tabernacle Church

Living people
1965 births
People from Philadelphia
People from Rocky Mount, North Carolina
Morehouse College alumni
21st-century American politicians
21st-century African-American politicians
Democratic Party members of the North Carolina House of Representatives